Sheyene Gerardi (Born April 13) is an Italo-Venezuelan former actress, producer, media proprietor, and mining executive. She is the Lead of Robotics Outreach at NASA (CLASS), where she co-founded the NASA´s Planetary Landing Team in 2018. Gerardi is the founder of the Sheyene Institute, she operates two philanthropic organizations through the Sheyene Gerardi Foundation. The Sheyene School, to address technological literacy. The Sheyene e-health, an electronic healthcare information delivery network for rare diseases, after becoming a survivor of an unclassifiable splenic hairy small B-Cell non-Hodgkin lymphoma, a rare cancer. Sheyene is member of The International Political Science Association (IPSA), the American Society of International Law and member to the Women's International League for Peace and Freedom

She is working with governments introducing robotics education into low-resource communities or conflict affected areas, such as rural schools, refugee camps, non-formal school systems and prison system.

Early life and career

Entertainment 
Her career as a professional model began in conjunction with her medical education; prior to attending university she represented her school in mathematics and chemistry competitions. Sheyene studied medicine at the Universidad Central de Venezuela. She worked as a model part time and participated in the Miss Venezuela Pageant. During her time at the university, the school plunged into turmoil, reaching the verge of closing as students protested. Around that time, a TV producer discovered Sheyene, and she garnered a starring role on a popular soap opera series that was broadcast internationally. Sheyene is known for her work in more than 30 countries, including Russia, Germany, Peru, Ecuador, Colombia, and Puerto Rico. Given her influence on the culture, a non-profit charity foundation in Barlovento, Venezuela — the Sheyene School — is named after her.

Gerardi has won several awards such as the Emmy Award, the 2 de Oro award, She has received the key of the city in Barlovento, the Meridiano de Oro award and the Imagen Awards. The actress has also credits in roles as a TV host. In 2016, Gerardi was named a Mogul Influencer in New York City.

Later career
Sheyene is the founder of the Sheyene Gerardi Network (SGN), a variety of mainstream entertainment forms, dedicated to foster awareness related to the space revolution.

On March 9, 2020, Sheyene began hosting a TV show documentary entitled "To the Moon and Back with Sheyene Gerardi" distributed through cable television, where Sheyene aims to educate about leading-edge technological developments. Sheyene is also executive producing this series.

NASA
Sheyene Gerardi is working with NASA Kennedy Space Center Swamp Works and the Florida Space Institute (FSI) to teach Planetary engineering and creating  robotics competitions for low-income children through Sheyene School.

In 2018, Sheyene was appointed as the Lead for Robotics Outreach at NASA's Center for Lunar and Asteroid Surface Science (CLASS), the Solar System Exploration Research Virtual Institute (SSERVI) and the Florida Space Institute (FSI). Gerardi co-founded the NASA´s Planetary Landing Team, a node of the Center for Lunar & Asteroid Surface Science (CLASS) at the University of Central Florida (UCF). Her role infusing scientific progress into robotics outreach includes to develop a series of robotics competitions for universities and to develop robotics for constructing landing pads on the Moon.

She is working with governments introducing robotics education into low-resource communities or conflict areas, such as rural schools, refugee camps and non-formal school systems. The program is serving prison systems providing assistance with education to people who has been wrongfully convicted.

Wealth
Gerardi acquired her wealth after her mother and father were killed in an automobile accident, leaving Sheyene with no living relatives.

Sheyene`s family has owned and operated a mining company, since 1954. Gerardi serves as a CEO of GEMS corporation, she took over the company after her parents died, one of her first major actions following the death of her parents was to implement automated mining. GEMS is acronym that stands for Gerardi, Edgar (her father), Marina (her mother), Sheyene. The family office, which opened in 2009, serves as the private investment vehicle for Sheyene.

Sheyene's lands are in the Orinoco Mining Arc, in the same area of the Cristinas and the Brisas mine, which, according to a business valuation, the property may be worth more than $1 billion. According to Roberto Mirabal, former minister of the Popular Power for Ecological Mining Development, the Orinoco Mining Arc has tons of reserves of gold, copper, diamond, coltan, iron, cerium, lanthanum, neodymium, thorium and other minerals and it has a potential of about 2 trillion dollars, which would make it the second biggest gold reserve in the world.

Another one of her businesses include a robotics product line for commercial use and the Sheyene Gerardi Network (SGN), a variety of mainstream entertainment forms, such as films, magazines and TV channel, that focus on various projects and activities within NASA, including the International Space Station, robotic missions and international Space launch.

Business career

Sheyene Institute
After becoming involved with NASA Sheyene founded the Sheyene Institute, a company that works on technologies to mining and manufacturing on the Moon, Mars and asteroids. The institute conducts applied research and development in Autonomous Navigation Technologies (ANTs).

Sheyene Gerardi Technology
Sheyene is active in the area of robotics towards autonomous mining and self-driving cars. In 2017, Sheyene established a robotic company spun out of the Sheyene Institute to commercialize her robotics product line for industrial and commercial uses. Sheyene's firm is a government solutions provider.

Headquartered in Silicon Valley, California, the company products are available for commercial, industrial, enterprise and university research applications. Sheyene Technology is a wholly owned subsidiary of the Sheyene Gerardi Family Office with additional offices in Shanghai, China and Barcelona, Spain.

Activism and Politics

Politics
In April 2020, Sheyene enrolled in the University of Naples Federico II to acquire a degree in Political science. Sheyene is currently working along with governments and international organizations to introduce robotics education into low-resource communities or conflict areas, such as rural schools, refugee camps, non-formal school systems and prison systems in concert with entertainment productions for social change to educate the public and guide them to take action.

Human rights and Peace activism
In 2020, Gerardi joined the American Society of International Law and became involved with the Women's International League for Peace and Freedom. Sheyene has been a featured speaker at several international business and technology forums, including the World Economic Forum, the World Government Summit and the Nobel Prize Summit. In the "Sheyene Institute founder´s letter", Gerardi stressed the importance of the role of entertainment with a long-standing interest in social issues such as technological literacy and the space revolution, as well as settlement work to uplift misrepresented people to Spurring Participation in Aerospace Competitiveness and Entrepreneurship (S.P.A.C.E), a movement intended to promote citizen participation in, and broadened ownership of, space industry.

Institutional affiliations

Sheyene is member of the American Political Science Association (APSA), member of the International Political Science Association (IPSA and to the committee on professional ethics, rights, and freedoms. Gerardi is member of L'association française de science politique (AFSP). Sheyene is also member of the American Society of International Law; and member of the Women's International League for Peace and Freedom.

Sheyene is both member of the Law and Ethics of Robotics committee group and strategic advisor of the Next Generation Committee of The Robotics Society of Japan, member of the Institute of Electrical and Electronics Engineers (IEEE) and the IEEE Robotics and Automation Society (RAS).

Education 

Gerardi graduated in art from institutions such as Charles III University of Madrid (UC3M), Sotheby's Institute of Art and Central University of Venezuela. Sheyene was accepted to a master's degree program for space In situ resource utilization (ISRU), offered by NASA Center for Lunar and Asteroid Surface Science (CLASS), she earned a master certification in Space Resource Utilization with 100% final grade, in 2018.Sheyene entered the University of Naples Federico II in 2020, to study Political science and to a Monte Carlo method program at Stanford University.

Personal life 

Sheyene Gerardi was born in Venezuela, she holds dual-citizenship with Italy, from where her mother hails.

In 2006, her mother and father were killed in an automobile accident, leaving Sheyene with no living relatives. A year later, she received a diagnosis of advanced lymphoma stage IV, a very rare type of cancer with only 60 cases reported worldwide with no survivors. The cancer was spread throughout 85% of her body and doctors gave her three months to live. Sheyene was treated by Dr. Humberto Caldera, in Florida. During her chemotherapy treatments, Gerardi worked in two films in Mexico, first, starred in La virgen de la caridad del cobre. Six months later, in Santa Juanita de los lagos. Gerardi underwent three years of chemotherapy, she suffered no hair loss.

Sheyene grew up an avid fan of racing, her father was a race-car driver in Venezuela; he had five consecutive wins before he died. Sheyene has spoken about her passion for sailing, she is a certified yacht captain and owns a yacht, named after her in Florida.

Philanthropy 

Sheyene operates two philanthropic organizations through the Sheyene Gerardi Foundation. The Sheyene School, a non-profit branch of the Sheyene Institute, to address technological literacy in robotics and STEM related fields, for low-income children in underdeveloped regions; and Sheyene E-health, which provides free medical consultations via Internet, email and via phone for people suffering from rare diseases.

Filmography

References

External links 

 
 
 CNN interview
 CNN interview
 La Invasora(2003)

Living people
Year of birth missing (living people)
Venezuelan people of Italian descent
Venezuelan philanthropists
Venezuelan women in business
People in the space industry
Space advocates
NASA people
Life extensionists
Businesspeople in information technology
Silicon Valley people
Stanford University people
Stanford University alumni
American technology chief executives
American technology company founders
Businesspeople from the San Francisco Bay Area
World Economic Forum Young Global Leaders
Businesspeople from New York (state)
People from Palo Alto, California
Members of the United States National Academy of Engineering
Fellows of the American Academy of Arts and Sciences
Businesspeople in mining
Women in mining
Mining in Venezuela
Venezuelan billionaires
Italian billionaires
Central University of Venezuela alumni
Alumni
Venezuelan actor-politicians
21st-century Venezuelan women politicians
21st-century Venezuelan politicians
People associated with identity politics
Political artists
Women's International League for Peace and Freedom
Women human rights activists
Pacifist feminists
South American pacifists
Venezuelan women activists
Venezuelan feminists
Venezuelan human rights activists
Mass media owners in Latin America
Venezuelan mass media owners
Actresses from Caracas
20th-century Venezuelan actresses
21st-century Venezuelan actresses
Venezuelan female models
Venezuelan film actresses
Venezuelan telenovela actresses
Venezuelan television actresses